Bee Spring is an unincorporated community in northern Edmonson County, Kentucky, United States. The population of the community's ZCTA was 1,335 at the 2000 census. It is part of the Bowling Green, Kentucky Metropolitan Statistical Area.

The town is located close to Nolin Lake State Park. KY 259 is the main road serving the town.

References

Unincorporated communities in Kentucky
Unincorporated communities in Edmonson County, Kentucky
Bowling Green metropolitan area, Kentucky